The 2020–21 Tulsa Golden Hurricane men's basketball team represents the University of Tulsa during the 2020–21 NCAA Division I men's basketball season. The Golden Hurricane, led by seventh-year head coach Frank Haith, plays their home games at the Reynolds Center in Tulsa, Oklahoma as members of the American Athletic Conference. They finished the season 11-12, 7-9 in AAC Play to finish in 7th place. They lost in the first round of the AAC tournament to Tulane.

Previous season
The Golden Hurricane finished the 2019–20 season 21–10, 13–5 in AAC play to finish in a three-way tie for first place. Frank Haith was named AAC Coach of the Year for the season. Due to tiebreaking rules, they received the No. 3 seed in the AAC tournament, which was canceled due to the ongoing coronavirus pandemic. Shortly thereafter, the NCAA tournament and all postseason tournaments were canceled, effectively ending Tulsa's season.

Offseason

Departures

Incoming transfers

2020 recruiting class

Tulsa will also add Preferred Walk-on Ari Seals a 6'3" guard from Frisco High School in Frisco, Texas. Seals is the son of current Tulsa assistant Shea Seals.

2021 recruiting class

Preseason

AAC preseason media poll

On October 28, The American released the preseason Poll and other preseason awards

Preseason Awards
 All-AAC First Team – Brandon Rachal

Roster

Schedule and results

COVID-19 impact

Due to the ongoing COVID-19 pandemic, the Golden Hurricane's schedule is subject to change, including the cancellation or postponement of individual games, the cancellation of the entire season, or games played either with minimal fans or without fans in attendance and just essential personnel.

Tulsa added a game vs. Southwestern Christian on December 23.
The game vs. UCF rescheduled for March 2 was moved to Orlando.
The game @ UCF originally scheduled for February 6 was moved to Tulsa.
The game @ Tulane scheduled for February 10 was moved to Tulsa.
Tulsa added a game vs. Northeastern State on March 3.

Tulsa announced that home games for the first month of the season would be played in front of no fans.

Schedule

|-
!colspan=12 style=| Regular season

|-
!colspan=9 style=| American Conference tournament
|-

|-

Awards and honors

American Athletic Conference honors

All-AAC Awards
Sixth Man of the Year: Darien Jackson

All-AAC Second Team
Brandon Rachal

Source

References

Tulsa Golden Hurricane men's basketball seasons
Tulsa
Tulsa Golden Hurricane men's basketball
Tulsa Golden Hurricane men's basketball